Rakkuyil (transl.Nightingale) is an Indian television soap opera that airs on Mazhavil Manorama on Monday to Saturday at 9 am IST and streams on Manorama Max. It is an adaptation of Mayadevi's Novel Raakuyil on Malayala Manorama. However, from episode 125 onwards, the show deviated from the original novel and currently its story is being written by Lydia Paul. Raakuyil is narrated from the point of view of the central character Thulasi.

Apart from the original schedule the series is retelecasted twice a day in the channel at 2:30 am, 10 am IST respectively. The show  timing was later shifted from 8.30 PM to 8.00 PM was also aired 7.00 PM initially. From late May 2021 the show was temporarily halted due to COVID-19 restrictions and from July 5, 2021 it was relaunched at 6.30 PM. From November 15, 2021 the show was moved to evening 6 pm slot.From January 24, 2022 the show was moved to morning 9 am(mon-sat).

Cast
 Archana Nair (Episode 1-64) →Devika Nambiar (Episode 65-330) as Thulasi: Female Protogoinst ,middle child of melepat family. Wife of Roy. Sister of Manasi and Nandu. Step mother of Emymol
 A Kind and beautiful women who is struggling to rebuilt her family and who is also moving with a good relationship with her husband, Roy Alex. She is the second wife of Roy, who has a daughter, Emy. Who loves Thulasi a lot.
 Lydia Paul (Apsara) as Manasi :Former Antagonist elder daughter of melepat family. Former wife of Karali Chandran, Sister of Thulasi and Nandu, Sathyadev's wife                                  
A Bold, Stern, Kind and a beautiful women who is straggling to rebuild her family which was broke by her former husband Karali Chandran who Married Manasi but wishes to marry her sister Thulasi, with an aim to steal the wealth of Melepat family.
Vishnu Prasad as Karali Chandran (dead) : Antagonist
Spoilt brat who cheats and marries Manasi but loves Thulasi who aims at destroying and taking over the wealth of Meleppattu Family.
Renjith Menon as Adv.Sathyadev Varma, Manasi's Husband, Roy's friend, Lakshmi and Varma's Son, Gowri's Brother and Mithra Brother- In- law
Ronson Vincent→Tom Mattel as CI Roy Alex Palathingal (dead) : Thulasi's husband, Emy mol's father, Eleena's former husband, Sathyadev's Friend and Manasi's Brother-in-law
Baby Lakshya as Emymol , Daughter of Roy and Eleena
Irine as Thara , Wife of Nandu
Bindu Murali (Episode 1-42)→ Sindhu Varma (Episode 43-present) as Bhanumathi
Wife of Menon and mother of Thulasi, Manasi and Nandu. She is the younger sister of Bhaskaran.
Akash Murali as Nandu
Youngest son of Menon and Bhanumathi who supports Thulasi
Amboori Jayan as Karali Shivarajan
Father of Chandran. Who supports Manasi
Karthika Kannan as Hemalatha, Sivarajan's second wife, who supports Manasi
Sumi Rashik as Mrunalini , Chandran's second wife
Naveen Kumar as Sunny : Roy's relative
Mukundan as Puthezhathu Bhaskaran
Elder brother of Bhanu, husband of Syrandhri and father of Jayakrishnan. He hates Madhavan.
Hemanth Kumar (Episode 1-42) →Niranjan Nair (Episode 43 -) as Jayakrishnan : 
Son of Bhaskaran and Syrandhri who loves Thulasi and later married Shyla
Umadevi Nair as Syrandhri
Wife of Bhaskaran, mother of Jayakrishnan who hates Meleppattu Family
Sivaji Guruvayoor as Meleppattu Karunakaran Menon
A kind hearted rich businessman, husband of Bhanu and father of Manasi, Thulasi and Nandu. He hates Karali family and so Chandran
Vindhuja Vikraman as Shyla
Jayakrishnan's wife
 Asha Nair as Sarala Balan 
a.k.a. Teacheramma, wife of Balan and close friend of Bhanu
 as Balan Maash
Aquantaince of Meleppattu Family
Sali Prajith as Smitha
Housemaid of Karali family who maintains an illegitimate relationship with Chandran and hates Manasi who later marries Chandran.
Thomas Kuriakose as Varma
Father of Indran, Gowri and Satyadev.  father-in-law of Mithra Varma and Manasi.
Ranju Lakshmi as Mithra Varma
Widow of Sathyadev's elder brother.
Biju Bahuleyan as Shibu
Kalyani Nair as Ashwani
Swathi Thara as Eleena
_ as Satheesh
Ann Mathews as Neha
Darshana Unni as Lakshmi , Satyadev's mother
Urmila Unni as Sujatha Teacher
Murali Mohan as Narendra Babu
Lal Mohan as Kiran
Friend of nandu
_ as Madhavan 
Karukaran's elder brother
Sajna Firoz as Anuradha
Leela Manacaud as Kumbidiamma
Sajith Sadasivan as Abhi
Prarthana Krishna as Gouri
Vijay Madhav as himself (Onam Special episode)

References

Malayalam-language television shows
2020 Indian television series debuts
Mazhavil Manorama original programming